Anne Balfour-Fraser (10 August 1923 – 26 July 2016) was a British film producer who specialised in documentaries.

Early life
Born Anne Balfour in Woking, Surrey, Balfour-Fraser's grandfather was Conservative politician Gerald Balfour, eventual Earl of Balfour, and her great-uncle Conservative Prime Minister Arthur Balfour. Her grandmother Betty Balfour (Bulwer-Lytton) and great-aunt Lady Constance Bulwer-Lytton were prominent suffragists, with Lytton going to prison several times for her activism.

Balfour-Fraser grew up at her family's home, Balbirnie, near Markinch, Fife, and studied at St Leonards school, St Andrews.

Career

World War II
During the second world war, Balfour-Fraser worked in a factory laboratory analyzing aluminum to repair aircraft. Balfour-Fraser's mother, Ruth Balfour, had been one of the first women to study at Cambridge and had worked as a doctor during World War II.

Music
As a child, Balfour-Fraser learned the flute, then studied singing at the Royal Academy of Music, London, eventually performing at La Scala in Milan.

Film
Balfour-Fraser formed a film production company called Inca, shortened form of Independent Cine Art.

She earned Academy Award and BAFTA nominations for the films she produced.

References

External links

1923 births
2016 deaths
British film producers
20th-century British businesspeople
Anne